Saiful Amar bin Sudar (born 10 June 1982) is a Malaysian footballer who plays as a goalkeeper for Negeri Sembilan in Malaysia Super League.

Club career
Saiful played for Sarawak for two seasons until the end of his contract in November 2013. Saiful has won the 2013 Malaysia Premier League during his time with Sarawak.

Saiful also has played for Selangor, PKNS and Kuala Lumpur, Kedah, PDRM and Perlis.

Career statistics

Club

References

External links
 Profile at Sarawak Football
 Profile at faselangor.my
 Profile at Selangor FanClub
Malaysian footballers
Kuala Lumpur City F.C. players
PKNS F.C. players
Selangor FA players
Sarawak FA players
Negeri Sembilan FA players
Perlis FA players
PDRM FA players
Malaysian people of Malay descent
Living people
1982 births
People from Selangor
Association football goalkeepers